Michael Krassner  is the eponymously titled debut solo album of composer Michael Krassner, released on May 18, 1999 through Atavistic Records.

Track listing

Personnel 
Musicians
Jim Becker – instruments
Jessica Billey – instruments
Gerald Dowd – instruments
Joe Ferguson – instruments, production, engineering, mixing
Ryan Hembrey – instruments
Wil Hendricks – instruments
Charles Kim – instruments
Glenn Kotche – drums, percussion
Michael Krassner – instruments, production, engineering, mixing
Fred Lonberg-Holm – cello, arrangement
Ernst Long – instruments
Steve Poulton – instruments
Production and additional personnel
Mike Hagler – mastering
Pierre Hambur – painting
Braden King – photography, design

References 

1999 albums
Atavistic Records albums